Tamandan (also Romanized as Tamandān) is a village in Taftan-e Jonubi Rural District, Nukabad District, Khash County, Sistan and Baluchestan Province, Iran. At the 2006 census, its population was 532, in 136 families.

References 

Populated places in Khash County